Harku Lake (also known as Haabersti Lake, Loodjärv and Argo Lake) is a  lake on the western border of Tallinn, Estonia.

Lake's beach is the only lakeside beach in Tallinn. On the beach, there are changing cabins, a shower, children’s playgrounds and ball games areas.

Gallery

See also
List of lakes in Estonia
Lake Ülemiste, another lake in Tallinn

References

External links

Lakes of Estonia
Landforms of Tallinn